Stannett is a surname. Notable people with the surname include:

 Angelique Stannett (born 1997), Australian rules footballer
 Shane Stannett (born 1966), New Zealand wrestler
 Vivian Stannett (1917–2002), American chemical engineer

See also
 Stennett (surname)